Tony Booth or Anthony Booth may refer to:
Tony Booth (actor) (1931–2017), British actor and political campaigner
Tony Booth (artist) (1933–2017), poster artist for The Beatles
Tony Booth (musician) (born 1943), American country & western singer
Anthony Clarke Booth (1846–1899), recipient of the Victoria Cross